The Jaipur International Film Festival (JIFF) is held annually in Jaipur, India, since 2009. The festival is conducted by the Jaipur International Film Festival Trust.

The Jaipur International Film Festival started in 2009 under Hanu Roj.

The 8th edition of JIFF took place from 2 January 2016 with Prakash Jha as the Chief Guest. The 10th JIFF was held on 6–10 January 2018. The 12th JIFF was held on 17–21 January 2020

The 13th Jaipur International Film Festival (JIFF) was held from 15 to 19 January 2021 in Jaipur, India.

References

External links

Film festivals in India
Tourist attractions in Jaipur
Film festivals established in 2009
2009 establishments in Rajasthan
Festivals in Rajasthan